June Clyde (born Ina Parton, December 2, 1909 – October 1, 1987) was an American actress, singer and dancer known for roles in such pre-Code films as A Strange Adventure (1932) and A Study in Scarlet (1933).

Early years
June Clyde was born on December 2, 1909, near Maysville, Missouri, as Ina Parton. She was the third child of William Arthur Parton and Orpha Dorothy Day. William and Orpha divorced about 1913, when Orpha took the three girls to live in St. Joseph, Missouri. The girls were nieces of actress Leona Hutton. By 1915, the family moved to Arbuckle, California. Around 1916, Orpha married Harvey Arthur Clyde.

Career 
When Clyde was six years old, she appeared on stage as Baby Tetrazinia. When she was 19, she starred in the film Tanned Legs (1929).

She was a WAMPAS Baby Star of 1932 and she progressed in a career in Hollywood films before marrying film director Thornton Freeland. Clyde moved to England with her husband and appeared in several British films and stage productions starting in 1934, as well as returning to the United States periodically for both stage and film work.

On Broadway, Clyde portrayed Annabel Lewis in Hooray For What! (1937) and Sally Trowbridge in Banjo Eyes (1941). She was part of a production of Annie Get Your Gun that toured in Australia, including a month in Sydney.

Personal life and death 
Clyde married Freeland in Hollywood on September 12, 1930.

Filmography

 Street Girl (1929) - Hot Blonde at McGregor's (uncredited)
 Side Street (1929) - Judy - the Singer (uncredited)
 Tanned Legs (1929) - Peggy Reynolds
 Hit the Deck (1929) - Toddy
 The Cuckoos (1930) - Ruth Chester
 Midnight Mystery (1930) - Louise Hollister
 Humanettes (1930, Short)
 Arizona (1931) - Bonita 'Bonnie' Palmer
 The Mad Parade (1931) - Janice Lee
 Morals for Women (1931) - Lorraine Huston
 Branded Men (1931) - Dale Wilson
 The Secret Witness (1931) - Tess Jones
 Steady Company (1932) - Peggy
 The Cohens and Kellys in Hollywood (1932) - Kitty Kelly
 Racing Youth (1932) - Ameliz Cruickshank
 Radio Patrol (1932) - Vern Wiley
 Thrill of Youth (1932) - Jill Fenwick
 Back Street (1932) - Freda Schmidt
 The All American (1932) - Betty Poe
 The Finishing Touch (1932, Short)
 Tess of the Storm Country (1932) - Teola Garfield
 A Strange Adventure (1932) - 'Nosey' Toodles
 Oh! My Operation (1932, Short)
 File 113 (1933) - Madeline
 Forgotten (1933) - Lena Strauss
 Room Mates (1933, Short)
 A Study in Scarlet (1933) - Eileen Forrester
 Hold Me Tight (1933) - Dottie
 Her Resale Value (1933) - Mary Harris
 Only Yesterday (1933) - Deborah
 I Hate Women (1934) - Anne Meredith
 Hollywood Party (1934) - Linda Clemp
 Hollywood Mystery (1934) - Doris Dawn
 Dance Band (1935) - Pat Shelley
 No Monkey Business (1935) - Clare Barrington
 She Shall Have Music (1935) - Dorothy Drew
 Charing Cross Road (1935) - Pam
 King of the Castle (1936) - Marilyn Bean
 Land Without Music (1936) - Sadie Whistler
 Aren't Men Beasts! (1937) - Marie
 Let's Make a Night of It (1937) - Peggy Boydell
 Make-Up (1937) - Joy
 School for Husbands (1937) - Diana Cheswick
 Intimate Relations (1937) - Molly Morell
 Sam Small Leaves Town (1937) - Sally Elton
 Weddings Are Wonderful (1938) - Cora Sutherland
 His Lordship Goes to Press (1938) - Valerie Lee
 Country Fair (1941) - Pepper Wilson
 Unfinished Business (1941) - Clarisse
 Sealed Lips (1942) - Lois Grant
 Hi'ya, Chum (1943) - Madge Tracy
 Seven Doors to Death (1944) - Mary Rawling
 Hollywood and Vine (1945) - Gloria Devine
 Behind the Mask (1946) - Edith Merrill
 Night Without Stars (1951) - Claire
 Treasure Hunt (1952) - Mrs. Cleghorne-Thomas
 24 Hours of a Woman's Life (1952) - Mrs. Roche
 The Love Lottery (1954) - Viola
 After the Ball (1957) - Lottie Gilson
 The Vise (1957) - Mrs. Forbes
 The Story of Esther Costello (1957)

Stage credits
 1934 - Lucky Break, London musical
 1935 - The Flying Trapeze, London musical
 1937 - Hooray for What!, Broadway musical
 1941 - Banjo Eyes, Broadway musical
1948 - Born Yesterday, Australian production

References

External links

 
 
 

1909 births
1987 deaths
Actors from St. Joseph, Missouri
Actresses from Missouri
American female dancers
Dancers from Missouri
American film actresses
American musical theatre actresses
American expatriates in England
Vaudeville performers
20th-century American actresses
20th-century American singers
People from Maysville, Missouri
20th-century American women singers
WAMPAS Baby Stars
20th-century American dancers
American stage actresses